A Fork in the Tale is a full motion video (FMV) comedic adventure game developed by Advance Reality Interactive and published  by Any River Entertainment on February 28, 1997. The game draws a heavy influence from Don Bluth's Dragon's Lair games and features Bay Area actors Dale Morris, Fred Smith, Michael Ronin Orlando, Eric Carlson, Kaliopi Eleni, Jett, Pamela Herron and Jody Mortara among the fifty plus roles, as well as voice-overs by comedian Rob Schneider. Because of the large number of video sequences, the game was originally released on 5 CDs.

Plot and gameplay 
The protagonist finds himself in the land of Eseveron. The player must click on certain icons at specific times to proceed, all in an effort to figure out what is happening and how to escape.

Development
The game was in development for three and a half years with a budget of $2 million.

Reception

PC Gamer US called A Fork in the Tale "a dismal flop, uniformly panned by critics and avoided by gamers, who bought less than 1,000 copies."

A Next Generation critic complained about the small amount of interactivity and said Rob Schneider's vocal delivery is mediocre. Charles Ardai of Computer Gaming World also criticized the limited interactivity and Schneider's performance, but focused most of his commentary on the repetitiveness of the video clips. He summarized, "At its best, it's reasonably funny; at its worst, the comedy is abysmal. But since the gameplay involves going through the same FMV scenes over and over and over, even the best comedy in the world couldn't stave off a creeping sense that you have been damned to some sort of Sisyphean penance." Game Revolution thought the game was short and easy, yet fun. In contrast, Rebecca Anderson of GameSpot considered the plot interesting but the gameplay frustratingly difficult, saying that the game demands the player to make decisions on a split second's notice, and sends the player back too far after failures.

References

External links
 
 

1997 video games
Windows games
Windows-only games
Interactive movie video games
Adventure games
Full motion video based games
Video games developed in the United States
Single-player video games